Thomas Michael Wilkin (born September 29, 1959) is an American politician in the state of Minnesota. He served in the Minnesota House of Representatives.

References

Republican Party members of the Minnesota House of Representatives
1959 births
Living people